An Historical Description of Three Kingdoms: Congo, Matamba, and Angola (Italian Istorica descrizione de' tre' regni Congo, Matamba et Angola) is an extensive work written by Giovanni Antonio Cavazzi da Montecuccolo, an Italian Capuchin missionary, over a long period while working as a missionary in Angola, between 1654 and 1677.

The work was commissioned by the Holy Congregation for the Propagation of the Faith when Cavazzi returned from his first missionary trip to Angola in 1668.  He completed a draft of the manuscript of the work around 1671, but opposition from the Church, primarily because of many miracle stories, which had fallen out of favor in the church, prevented its publication.  After an interval, the task of editing the work was given to another Capuchin, Fortunato da Alamandini, who edited it, and it was eventually published in 1687 in Bologna.  A second edition appeared in Milan in 1690

Cavazzi probably began writing this work around 1660, perhaps in response to his witnessing the conversion of Queen Njinga to Christianity, which he regarded as something of a miracle.  He wrote several drafts of a work which he called "Missione Evangelica" which he completed in 1668.  This work, which is in the possession of the Araldi Family of Modena, Italy, was published in English translation on the internet by John Thornton, with a full introduction, and a comparison between this early manuscript and that of the eventual book.

References

Cavazzi da Montecuccolo, Giovanni Antonio (1687).  Istorica descrizione de tre regni Congo, Matamba ed Angola. Bologna:  Giacomo Monti.

Translations
Labat, Jean-Baptiste (1732). Relation historique de l'Ethiopie occidental.  Paris: Delespine.  5 vols.
 
Saccardo, Graziano [da Luggazano] (1965) ed. and trans. Descrição histórica dos três reinos Congo, Angola e Matamba.  Lisbon:  Agência Geral do Ultramar.  2 vols.

Commentary
Cuvelier, Jean (1949).  "Notes sur Cavazzi," Zaire 3: 175–84.

Pistoni, Giuseppe (1969)"I manoscritti 'Araldi' di Padre Giovanni Antonio Cavazzi da Montecuccolo," Atti e memorie, Accademia di scienze, lettere e arti di Mondena 2: 152–65.

idem(1972).  Fra Giovanni Antonio Cavazzi da Montecuccolo:  Documenti inediti Modena

Thornton, John (1979).  "New Light on Cavazzi's Seventeenth Century Description of Kongo," History in Africa 6:  253–64.

Notes
 

African travel books
History books about Africa